This is a list of electoral districts or ridings in Canada for the Canadian federal election of 1917 and 1921.

Electoral Districts are constituencies that elect Members of Parliament in Canada's House of Commons.

Nova Scotia – 16 seats
Antigonish—Guysborough
Cape Breton South and Richmond*
Colchester
Cumberland
Digby and Annapolis
Halifax*
Hants
Inverness
Kings
Lunenburg
North Cape Breton and Victoria
Pictou
Shelburne and Queen's
Yarmouth and Clare

Prince Edward Island – 4 seats
King's
Prince
Queen's*

When the new arrangement was devised in 1914, it gave PEI only three seats.  After public complaints, a rule that a province could not have fewer MPs than Senators was introduced giving PEI back a fourth seat in 1915.  The arrangement with only three PEI seats was never used in an election.

New Brunswick – 11 seats
Charlotte
Gloucester
Kent
Northumberland
Restigouche—Madawaska
Royal
St. John—Albert*
Victoria—Carleton
Westmorland
York—Sunbury

Quebec – 65 seats
Argenteuil
Bagot
Beauce
Beauharnois
Bellechasse
Berthier
Bonaventure
Brome
Chambly—Verchères
Champlain
Charlevoix—Montmorency
Châteauguay—Huntingdon
Chicoutimi—Saguenay
Compton
Dorchester
Drummond—Arthabaska
Gaspé
George-Étienne Cartier
Hochelaga
Hull
Jacques Cartier
Joliette
Kamouraska
L'Assomption—Montcalm
L'Islet
Labelle
Laprairie—Napierville
Laurier—Outremont
Laval—Two Mountains
Lévis
Lotbinière
Maisonneuve
Maskinongé
Matane
Mégantic
Missisquoi
Montmagny
Nicolet
Pontiac
Portneuf
Quebec County
Quebec East
Quebec South
Quebec West
Richelieu
Richmond—Wolfe
Rimouski
Shefford
Town of Sherbrooke
St. Ann
St. Antoine
St. Denis
St. Hyacinthe—Rouville
St. James
St. Johns—Iberville
St. Lawrence—St. George
St. Mary
Stanstead
Témiscouata
Terrebonne
Three Rivers and St. Maurice
Vaudreuil—Soulanges
Westmount—St. Henri
Wright
Yamaska

Ontario – 82 seats
Algoma East
Algoma West
Brant
Brantford
Bruce North
Bruce South
Carleton
Dufferin
Dundas
Durham
Elgin East
Elgin West
Essex North
Essex South
Fort William and Rainy River
Frontenac
Glengarry and Stormont
Grenville
Grey North
Grey Southeast
Haldimand
Halton
Hamilton East
Hamilton West
Hastings East
Hastings West
Huron North
Huron South
Kent
Kingston
Lambton East
Lambton West
Lanark
Leeds
Lennox and Addington
Lincoln
London
Middlesex East
Middlesex West
Muskoka
Nipissing
Norfolk
Northumberland
Ontario North
Ontario South
Ottawa (City of)*
Oxford North
Oxford South
Parkdale
Parry Sound
Peel
Perth North
Perth South
Peterborough East
Peterborough West
Port Arthur and Kenora
Prescott
Prince Edward
Renfrew North
Renfrew South
Russell
Simcoe East
Simcoe North
Simcoe South
Timiskaming
Toronto Centre
Toronto East
Toronto North
Toronto South
Toronto West
Victoria
Waterloo North
Waterloo South
Welland
Wellington North
Wellington South
Wentworth
York East
York North
York South
York West

Manitoba – 15 seats
Brandon
Dauphin
Lisgar
Macdonald
Marquette
Neepawa
Nelson
Portage la Prairie
Provencher
Selkirk
Souris
Springfield
Winnipeg Centre
Winnipeg North
Winnipeg South

Saskatchewan – 16 seats
Assiniboia
Battleford
Humboldt
Kindersley
Last Mountain
Mackenzie
Maple Creek
Moose Jaw
North Battleford
Prince Albert
Qu'Appelle
Regina
Saltcoats
Saskatoon
Swift Current
Weyburn

Alberta – 12 seats
Battle River
Bow River
Calgary West
East Calgary
Edmonton East
Edmonton West
Lethbridge
Macleod
Medicine Hat
Red Deer
Strathcona
Victoria

British Columbia – 13 seats
Burrard
Cariboo
Comox—Alberni
Kootenay East
Kootenay West
Nanaimo
New Westminster
Skeena
Vancouver Centre
Vancouver South
Victoria City
Westminster District (renamed Fraser Valley in 1919)
Yale

Yukon – 1 seat
Yukon
*returned two members

1914-1924